The 2021 McDonald's All-American Girls Game was an all-star basketball game that was scheduled be held in 2021. The game's rosters featured the best and most highly recruited high school girls graduating in the class of 2021. The game would have been the 20th annual version of the McDonald's All-American Game first played in 2002. Due to the impact of the COVID-19 pandemic, the game was cancelled and the players were honored virtually. The 24 players were selected from over 700 nominees by a committee of basketball experts. They were chosen not only for their on-court skills, but for their performances off the court as well.

Rosters
The roster was announced on February 23, 2021. South Carolina had the most selections with four, while North Carolina, Texas and UConn had three selections each.

References

2021 in American women's basketball
2021